Maurice Jones (born 1964) is an American executive and former official in the US Department of Housing and Urban Development.

Maurice Jones may also refer to:

Maurice Jones (priest), (1863–1957), priest and university educator 
Maurice Jones (basketball) (born 1991), American basketball player

See also
Maurice Jones-Drew (born 1985), American football player
Morris Jones (disambiguation)